Tlemcen is a province (wilaya) in  northwestern Algeria. The Tlemcen National Park is located there.

History
The province was created from Oran (department) and Tlemcen department in 1974.

Administrative divisions
The province is divided into 20 districts (daïras), which are further divided into 53 communes or municipalities.

Districts

 Aïn Talout
 Bab El Assa
 Bensekrane
 Béni Boussaïd
 Béni Snous
 Chatouane
 Felaoucene
 Ghazaouet
 Hennaya
 Houanaine District (Honaine)
 Maghnia
 Mansourah
 Marsa Ben M'Hidi
 Nedroma
 Ouled Mimoun
 Remchi
 Sabra
 Sebdou
 Sidi Djillali
 Tlemcen

Communes

 Ain Fetah (Ain Fettah)
 Ain Fezza
 Ain Ghoraba
 Ain Kebira
 Ain Nehala
 Ain Tellout (Ain Tallout)
 Ain Youcef
 Amieur
 Azails
 Bab El Assa
 Beni Bahdel
 Beni Boussaid
 Beni Khellad (Formerly Souk El Khemis)
 Beni Mester
 Beni Ouarsous
 Beni Smiel (Beni Semiel)
 Beni Snous
 Bensekrane
 Bouhlou
 Chetouane
 Dar Yaghmoricene (Dar Yaghmouracene)
 Djebala
 El Aricha
 El Bouihi (Bouihi)
 El Fehoul
 El Gor
 Fellaoucene
 Ghazaouet
 Hammam Boughrara
 Hennaya
 Honaine (Houanaine)
 Maghnia
 Mansourah
 Marsa Ben Mhidi (Marsa Ben M'Hidi)
 Msirda Fouaga
 Nedroma
 Oued Chouli (Oued Chouly)
 Ouled Mimoun
 Ouled Riyah
 Remchi
 Sabra
 Sebaa Chioukh (Sebbaa Chioukh)
 Sebdou
 Sidi Abdelli
 Sidi Djilali (Sidi Djillali)
 Sidi Medjahed
 Souahlia
 Souani
 Souk Thlata (Souk Tleta, Souk Tlata)
 Terni Beni Hediel (Terny Beni Hediel, Tirni Beni Hediel)
 Tianet
 Tlemcen
 Zenata

References

 
Provinces of Algeria
 States and territories established in 1974